Gravitcornutia strigulata is a species of moth of the family Tortricidae. It is found in Rio de Janeiro, Brazil.

The wingspan is 14 mm. The ground colour of the forewings is whitish, mostly mixed with greyish and strigulated (finely streaked) brown. The markings are dark brown. The hindwings are cream with a weak brownish admixture, especially in the distal area.

Etymology
The species' name refers to forewing markings and is derived from Latin strigulata (meaning strigulated).

References

Moths described in 2010
Gravitcornutia
Moths of South America
Taxa named by Józef Razowski